Sir Charles Hardy (c. 1714 – 18 May 1780) was a Royal Navy officer and politician who sat in the House of Commons between 1764 and 1780. He served as colonial governor of New York from 1755 to 1757.

Early career
Born at Portsmouth, the son of Vice-Admiral Sir Charles Hardy, Charles Hardy joined the Royal Navy as a volunteer in 1731.

He became a captain in the Royal Navy on 10 August 1741, around the age of 27. His first command was the 24-gun , stationed off the British Carolinas from January 1742 to February 1744. In 1744 he was appointed governor and commander-in-chief of the British colony of Newfoundland, though there is no record of his visiting it during his term in office. In 1745 he took command of HMS Torrington, assisting in the protection of a convoy which brought reinforcements from Gibraltar to the newly captured fortress of Louisbourg.

He was knighted in 1755 and served as governor of the Colony of New York from 1755 to 1757 (replaced by James Delancey). During his term he was made Rear-Admiral of the Blue.

Seven Years' War

In 1757, under the command of Vice Admiral Francis Holburne, Hardy escorted Lord Loudoun and his army from New York to Halifax intending to attack Louisbourg, but the attack was called off when Louisbourg was found to be strongly defended by a French fleet. The next year, he was second in command under Admiral Edward Boscawen at the successful Siege of Louisbourg.

That autumn, he and James Wolfe attacked French posts around the mouth of the St. Lawrence River and destroyed all of the French fishing stations along the northern shores of what is now New Brunswick and along the Gaspé Peninsula. He also participated in Hawke's victory at the Battle of Quiberon Bay in 1759.

Hardy served as the governor of Greenwich Hospital from 1771 to 1780. In 1778, he was made Admiral of the White. In 1779 he became Commander-in-Chief of the Channel Fleet, remaining in that post until his death in May 1780.

Member of Parliament
Hardy sat as Member of Parliament for Rochester from 1764 to 1768 and for Plymouth from 1771 to 1780.

Personal life
In 1749 he married Mary Tate, however she died the next year without issue and left her home Delapré Abbey to Hardy which he sold in 1764 to Edward Bouverie for £22,000. Following his first wife's death, he married Catharine Stanyan, the daughter of Temple Stanyan. Through Catherine, he inherited Temple Stanyan's estate at Rawlins, Oxfordshire.

The couple had three sons and two daughters. Sir Charles Hardy died at Spithead. He bequeathed  £3000 to each of the sons and £4000 to each daughter, as well as leaving his estate to his eldest son Temple Hardy. By Catharine's death in 1801, only Temple survived of the three sons. Hardy's brother Josiah was a merchant and the Governor of New Jersey from 1761 to 1763.

See also
 Governors of Newfoundland
 List of people of Newfoundland and Labrador

References

 
 

|-

1710s births
1780 deaths
Politicians from Portsmouth
Knights Bachelor
Governors of the Province of New York
Lords of the Admiralty
Members of the Parliament of Great Britain for Plymouth
British MPs 1761–1768
British MPs 1768–1774
British MPs 1774–1780
Governors of Newfoundland Colony
Royal Navy admirals
Royal Navy personnel of the Seven Years' War
Military personnel from Portsmouth